Parker Duncan Moore is a Republican American politician who has served in the Alabama House of Representatives from the 4th district since 2018.

References

Living people
Republican Party members of the Alabama House of Representatives
21st-century American politicians
1989 births